Gridley is an unincorporated community in Emmet County, Iowa, United States.

History
Gridley was platted in 1899 when the Chicago & Northwestern railroad was extended to that point. The railroad company named the town after  Ashel Gridley, an Illinois banker. A post office was established in Gridley in 1900, and remained in operation until being discontinued in 1910.

Gridley's population was 27 in 1925.

References

Unincorporated communities in Emmet County, Iowa
Unincorporated communities in Iowa